Katarina Ammitzbøll (born 15 July 1969 in Charlottenlund) is a Danish politician, who is a member of the Folketing for the Conservative People's Party. She was elected into parliament at the 2019 Danish general election.

Political career
Ammitzbøll first ran for parliament in the 2015 Danish general election, where she received 1,149 votes. This resulted in her becoming a substitute member of the Folketing in the 2015-2019 term, though she was not called upon during the term. She was elected into the municipal council of Gentofte Municipality at the 2017 local election. She ran for parliament again in the 2019 election where she received 2,261, securing her a seat in the Folketing.

External links 
 Biography on the website of the Danish Parliament (Folketinget)

References 

Living people
1969 births
People from Gentofte Municipality
21st-century Danish women politicians
Women members of the Folketing
Conservative People's Party (Denmark) politicians
Danish municipal councillors
Members of the Folketing 2019–2022